George Lake Aerodrome  is a privately owned ice runway located on George Lake, Nunavut, Canada. The aerodrome, which is open from January to April, services the related explorations for gold as part of the Back River Gold Project.

References

Registered aerodromes in the Kitikmeot Region